William Morgan Jellett, QC (19 May 1857 – 27 October 1936) was an Irish Unionist Member of Parliament (MP) in the Parliament of the United Kingdom. The Irish Unionists were the Irish wing of the Conservative Party. He was born in Dublin, the son of Rev. John Hewitt Jellett, Provost of Trinity College, Dublin  and his wife and cousin Dorothea Morris Morgan. His sister Eva Jellett was a pioneering woman doctor.

He attended Trinity College Dublin, before being called to the Irish Bar in 1882. He became a Queen's Counsel (QC) in 1899. He was private secretary to Lord Ashbourne, the Lord Chancellor of Ireland 1885–6, 1886-1892 and 1895–1905.

Jellett stood for election in the Dublin University constituency at the 1918 general election. On 28 July 1919, he was elected in a by-election, being the last United Kingdom MP elected in the twenty-six counties which became the Irish Free State in December 1922. Jellett ceased to be an MP on 26 October 1922 on the dissolution of parliament, and his constituency ceased to be represented in the United Kingdom Parliament.

He married Janet McKenzie Stokes, a talented musician, and was the father of four daughters, including the celebrated artist Mainie Jellett, and Dorothea (Bay) Jellett, who for many years conducted the orchestra at the Gaiety Theatre, Dublin.

References

External links
 
 

1857 births
1936 deaths
Irish Queen's Counsel
Alumni of Trinity College Dublin
Politicians from County Dublin
Irish Unionist Party MPs
Irish Conservative Party MPs
UK MPs 1918–1922
Members of the Parliament of the United Kingdom for Dublin University
Teachtaí Dála for Dublin University